Sansana is a religious Israeli settlement in the West Bank. Located in the southern Judaean Mountains, to the south-west of Hebron and over the Green Line, it is organised as a community settlement and falls under the jurisdiction of Har Hevron Regional Council.

The international community considers Israeli settlements in the West Bank illegal under international law, but the Israeli government disputes this.

History
The settlement was established in 1997 as a Nahal settlement, the first kvutza arrived on 21 April 1999, and it was civilianised by members of the Or Movement in 2000. Its name is taken from the name of a Biblical village nearby (Joshua 15:31) and from Song of Songs 7:9;
I said: 'I will climb up into the palm-tree, I will take hold of the branches thereof; and let thy breasts be as clusters of the vine, and the smell of thy countenance like apples;

References

External links

Sansana Negev Information Centre

Religious Israeli settlements
Community settlements
Nahal settlements
Populated places established in 1997
1997 establishments in the Palestinian territories
Israeli settlements in the West Bank